The 2008 Cork Junior A Hurling Championship was the 111th staging of the Cork Junior A Hurling Championship since its establishment by the Cork County Board in 1895. The championship began on 20 September 2008 and ended on 19 October 2008.

On 19 October 2008, Dripsey won the championship following a 0-13 to 1-07 defeat of Diarmuid Ó Mathúna's in the final at Páirc Uí Chaoimh. This was their first championship title in the grade.

Dripsey's Diarmuid O'Riordan was the championship's top scorer with 1-26.

Qualification

Results

First round

Semi-finals

Final

Championship statistics

Top scorers

Overall

In a single game

References

Cork Junior Hurling Championship
Cork Junior Hurling Championship